Nerkoonjärvi may refer to:

 Nerkoonjärvi (Iisalmi), a lake in Finland
 Nerkoonjärvi (Kihniö), a lake in Finland